Fernando Büttenbender Prass (born 9 July 1978) is a Brazilian football pundit and former player who played as a goalkeeper.

Club career

Early years
Prass was born in Porto Alegre. After starting professionally with local Grêmio (but never playing a senior match for them), he joined Francana in 2000, on loan.

In 2001, Prass joined Campeonato Brasileiro Série B side Vila Nova, becoming a starter midway through the season. He moved to Coritiba in the Série A the following year, and spent four seasons there.

In December 2004, already an undisputed starter, Prass renewed his contract.

União Leiria
In June 2005, Prass moved abroad and joined Portugal's União de Leiria, as compatriot Helton had left for Porto also of the Primeira Liga. He made his league debut on 11 September 2005 in a 0–0 home draw against Marítimo, and retained first-choice status from that moment onwards.

In the 2006–07 season, Prass only missed two league games as Leiria finished seventh and qualified for the UEFA Intertoto Cup, eventually being one of the competition's winners and appearing in the UEFA Cup, being ousted by Bayer Leverkusen in the first round (4–5 on aggregate). The following campaign, the team dropped down to the second division.

Vasco da Gama
After appearing in 14 matches to help União return to the top flight in 2009, the 31-year-old Prass returned to his country and signed for Vasco da Gama, playing in the second level for the first time in 110 years of history. Rarely missing a match, he helped the Rio de Janeiro side finish as champions and promote immediately, with the best defensive record in the league.

Palmeiras
On 10 December 2012, Prass left Vasco and joined Palmeiras, recently relegated to the second tier. He helped them return to the top tier at the first attempt; he quickly became a fan favorite due to his saves and was eventually named team captain, as he led them to their third Copa do Brasil title in 2015, scoring the last penalty against rivals Santos in a 4–3 shoot-out victory.

On 3 April 2016, Prass saved Lucca's penalty in a 1–0 home win over Corinthians, the Alviverdes first win over their rival at Pacaembu for nearly 21 years. After a good start to the season, he was sidelined with a shoulder injury until December. While his replacement Jailson had a superb year, Prass was handed back the starting role as soon as he recovered.

Midway through the 2017 campaign, however, Jailson was again named first choice over Prass. This only lasted five games as the latter was once again named starter, this time due to an injury to the former.

Prass extended his contract with Palmeiras until December 2018. After Jailson's recovery and the signing of Weverton in January of that year, he was demoted to third option on the squad.

On 7 December 2019, Prass departed the club.

Ceará
On 8 January 2020, at the age of 41, Prass signed a one-year deal with Ceará. He retired at the end of the season.

International career
On 29 June 2016, aged nearly 38 and having never earned any cap for the full side, Prass was selected by the Brazilian national team for the 2016 Summer Olympics by manager Rogério Micale, as one of three overage players. On 31 July, however, he left the squad due to an elbow injury and was replaced by Weverton.

Style of play
Prass was known for his ability to save penalty kicks, also working closely with Palmeiras employees to study his adversaries. In March 2017, coach Émerson Leão said he would be the perfect choice to lecture younger players in the position who made the national team.

Post-retirement
Prass became an analyst after retiring, working with TNT Sports for Palmeiras matches in the 2022 Campeonato Paulista.

Club statistics

Honours

Club
Grêmio
Campeonato Gaúcho: 1999
Copa Sul: 1999

Vila Nova
Campeonato Goiano: 2001

Coritiba
Campeonato Paranaense: 2004

Vasco
Campeonato Brasileiro Série B: 2009
Copa do Brasil: 2011

Palmeiras
Campeonato Brasileiro Série A: 2016, 2018
Campeonato Brasileiro Série B: 2013
Copa do Brasil: 2015

Ceará
Copa do Nordeste: 2020

Individual
Bola de Prata: 2011
Campeonato Paulista Team of the Year: 2015

References

External links

 

 

1978 births
Living people
Brazilian people of German descent
Footballers from Porto Alegre
Brazilian footballers
Association football goalkeepers
Campeonato Brasileiro Série A players
Campeonato Brasileiro Série B players
Grêmio Foot-Ball Porto Alegrense players
Vila Nova Futebol Clube players
Coritiba Foot Ball Club players
CR Vasco da Gama players
Sociedade Esportiva Palmeiras players
Ceará Sporting Club players
Primeira Liga players
Liga Portugal 2 players
U.D. Leiria players
Brazilian expatriate footballers
Expatriate footballers in Portugal
Brazilian expatriate sportspeople in Portugal